The 1944–45 Santosh Trophy was the 2nd edition of the Santosh Trophy, the main State competition for football in India. It was resumed in 1944 after a break of two years. Delhi defeated the defending champions Bengal in the final.

Like the previous tournament, the regional matches were played across India.

Preliminary Matches

Raman scored the winning goal in the extra time. This was the South Zone final and Mysore qualified to meet Bengal in the national semifinal. The match was attended by a crowd of twenty thousand.

Semi-final
According to the original schedule, the Mysore-Bengal semifinal was scheduled to be held in Calcutta on November 16 and final at Delhi on September 21. Mysore failed to turn up and the semifinal was postponed to September 28 and final to October 1.  Mysore again to appear on the new date and asked for a postponement for 10 days. Bengal was given a walk-over.

Final

Squads

 Hyderabad : Ferayya; Fruvall (captain) and Sher Khan; Muhammad Noor, Sheikjamal and Hadi;  Mohammadali, Syed Hafizali, Shamsheed Khan, Sussay and Khaja Moin
 Madras : Hussain; Rammohan Rao and Ranga Rao; Murugesan, Kothandan and Paul; Appalmurthi, Jayaraman, John Joseph, Narayana and Ayyadurai 
 Mysore : Basha, Rodgers, Jayaram, Henderson, Mohiuddin, Shanmugam, Karim, Tomkins, Somanna, Duncan, Raman, Nanjunda, Antony, Basheer, Chinnaswamy

The name of the Hyderabad goal keeper appears as Eeriah in the reports of 1945-46. The spellings Sussay, Susay and Susai are used for the Hyderabad forward.

References 

Santosh Trophy seasons
1944–45 in Indian football